Kristin Proctor (born April 16, 1978) is a Norwegian-American actress. She is the daughter of actor Philip Proctor and television producer Barbro Semmingsen.

Early life and education 
Born in the Los Angeles, Proctor grew up in Norway and made her debut, aged eight, on Norwegian television. She graduated from the Institute for Advanced Theater Training at Harvard University in 2000.

Career 
Proctor played Nina in Anton Chekhov's The Seagull. She went on to appear opposite Debra Winger in an American Repertory Theater production of Ivanov. She has performed on stage in Dublin, Oslo, London, New York, Boston and Los Angeles.

Proctor's first film role was in Riding in Cars with Boys. She has subsequently appeared in TV shows such as CSI: NY, Numb3rs, NCIS, All My Children, and The Wire.

Filmography

Film

Television

References

External links

Living people
1978 births
American people of Norwegian descent
Harvard University alumni
American actresses
21st-century American women